Vyacheslav Yuryevich Chadov (born 26 September 1986) is a Russian former professional football player.

Career
He played 8 seasons in the Russian Football National League for 6 different clubs.

On 4 January 2016, Chadov left FC Yenisey Krasnoyarsk by mutual consent.

References

External links
 
 

1986 births
Sportspeople from Novosibirsk
Living people
Russian footballers
Association football forwards
FC Chernomorets Novorossiysk players
FC SKA-Khabarovsk players
FC Salyut Belgorod players
FC Yenisey Krasnoyarsk players
FC Sibir Novosibirsk players
FC Rubin Kazan players
FC Neftekhimik Nizhnekamsk players
FC Zenit-Izhevsk players
FC Chita players
FC Amur Blagoveshchensk players